Technomarket (Cyrillic: Техномаркет) is a Bulgarian retailer of consumer electronics that operates stores in Bulgaria, Kosovo, Serbia, North Macedonia, Bosnia and Herzegovina, Slovakia, Montenegro and Romania. It also used to operate in Croatia, but failed.

Technomarket is the brand name of K&K Electronics, a Bulgarian company founded in 1992. K&K Electronics is owned by the London Stock Exchange-listed British Virgin Islands-based company Equest Investments Balkans Limited. The first Technomarket store opened in 1999. In 2007, K&K Electronics acquired the Romanian chain DOMO, which by the time had entered the Bulgarian market, and established the TechnomarketDomo Group. DOMO operates as a separate brand name in Romania and Bulgaria; in Bulgaria, that chain typically has smaller and more centrally located stores than Technomarket.

As of late 2009, Technomarket operates 42 stores in Bulgaria, 20 in Serbia, nine in North Macedonia, 14 in Bosnia and Herzegovina, two in Slovakia, seven in Kosovo, and 13 in Montenegro. In Romania, K&K Electronics has 126 stores, all operating under the DOMO brand.

Stores
These were the stores of Technomarket as of February 2018:

References

Retail companies established in 1992
Consumer electronics retailers
Retail companies of Bulgaria
Retail companies of Serbia
Retail companies of Romania
Bulgarian brands